Belnan is a small community in Nova Scotia, located on Route 214. Belnan is located between Elmsdale and Nine Mile River. It is located in the Rawdon/Maitland region of the Glooscap Trail, Hants County.

References
Belnan on Destination Nova Scotia

Communities in Hants County, Nova Scotia
General Service Areas in Nova Scotia